Stefanie Powers (born November 2, 1942) is an American actress. She is best known for her role as Jennifer Hart on the mystery television series Hart to Hart (1979–1984), for which she received nominations for two Primetime Emmy Awards and five Golden Globe Awards.

Early life
Powers was born in Hollywood as Stefania Zofya Paul, but her surname often was cited as Federkiewicz. In her Polish-language autobiography, Powers says, "" - translates to - "My real [Polish] name is Federkiewicz". At the age of 16, she was put under studio contract with Columbia Pictures, and as was the movie-industry custom in those days, her name change to the more Anglo-Saxon-sounding "Stefanie Powers" was made a part of the deal.

Her parents divorced during her childhood. Powers' father, Morrison Bloomfield Paul (1909–1993), reportedly a cinematographer, was born in Montreal to a Jewish immigrant family from Eastern Europe. Powers was estranged from her father, whom she barely refers to and whose name is never mentioned in her memoir One from the Hart, in which she refers to the "tension and unhappiness created by my father's presence". She remained very close throughout her life to her mother, who was born Juliana Dimitria Golan (1912–2009) on a farm near Middletown, New York to Catholic parents of Polish descent. Her mother, who died in Los Angeles from pneumonia at 96 years of age, was known late in life and in local obituaries as Julie Powers. Stefanie Powers had an older brother, Jeffrey Julian Paul (1940–2013), of Orangevale, California, as well as a half-sister, Diane Pascoe Hanson Baillie, who died in 2000. Powers was a cheerleader at Hollywood High School; for a time, one of her schoolmates was Nancy Sinatra, who graduated from University High in June 1958. In 1965, using the alias Taffy Paul, Powers made the obscure independent film The Young Sinner.

Career

Powers appeared in secondary roles in several movies in the early 1960s, such as Experiment in Terror (1962), If a Man Answers (1962), and McLintock! (1963). She played a schoolgirl in Tammy Tell Me True (1961), and Bunny, the police chief's daughter, in Palm Springs Weekend (1963). She appeared in the 1962 hospital melodrama The Interns and its sequel The New Interns in 1964. In 1965, she played opposite Tallulah Bankhead in Die! Die! My Darling (originally released in the UK as Fanatic).

In 1966, her "tempestuous" good looks led to being cast in the starring role as the passive and demure April Dancer, in the short-lived television series The Girl from U.N.C.L.E., a spin-off of The Man from U.N.C.L.E. Shortly after the series' debut, she was featured on the cover of TV Guide (December 31, 1966 – January 6, 1967). The article mentions her "117-pound frame is kept supple with 11 minutes of Royal Canadian Air Force exercises every morning... Unlike her fellow U.N.C.L.E. agents, the ladylike April is not required to kill the bad guys. Her feminine charms serve as the bait, while her partner Noel Harrison provides the fireworks." The series lasted for only one season (29 one-hour episodes), airing from September 16, 1966, to April 11, 1967.

In 1967, Powers appeared in Warning Shot with David Janssen. Her 1970s movies include The Boatniks (1970), Herbie Rides Again (a sequel to The Love Bug) and The Magnificent Seven Ride! (1972). She was a guest star in the Robert Wagner series It Takes a Thief in 1970. The two co-starred in the popular Hart to Hart series nine years later. Before success with Hart to Hart, she starred in The Feather and Father Gang as Toni "Feather" Danton, a successful lawyer, whose father, Harry Danton, was a smooth-talking ex-con man (played by Harold Gould). It ran for a half-season (13 episodes).

Powers' many guest roles in other popular TV shows include: Lancer (1969), McCloud (1971), The Mod Squad (1972),Banacek (1972), Kung Fu (1974), The Rockford Files (1975), Three for the Road (1975), The Six Million Dollar Man (1976), The Bionic Woman (1976), and McMillan & Wife (1977). Powers appeared in these shows long after she signed a contract with Universal Studios in 1970. Coincidentally, her longtime friend and Hart to Hart series co-star Wagner signed a contract with Universal, but did not guest-star in more shows than Powers did.

In 1977, Powers played Sally Whalen in the six-part television miniseries Washington: Behind Closed Doors, produced by Paramount Television. It is based on John Ehrlichman's book The Company, a novel inspired by the author's time with the Nixon administration. The series had Powers cast with a strong cast, including Cliff Robertson, Jason Robards, Robert Vaughn, Lois Nettleton and John Houseman.

In 1978, Powers starred with Paul Clemens and Brian Dennehy in the TV movie A Death in Canaan, directed by Tony Richardson. This TV movie was a dramatization of the nonfictional account of Connecticut townspeople rising to the defense of a local teenager charged with the mutilation murder of his mother in September 1973. Powers portrayed Joan Barthel, a freelance‐writer who brought attention to the original case. Clemens, son of actress Eleanor Parker, made his film acting debut here. The TV-movie also marked the American TV directing debut of Richardson, and was Emmy Award-nominated as Outstanding Special of the 1977–78 season.

In 1978, Powers and Stacy Keach were the leads in the stage play Cyrano de Bergerac in a season at the Central Theater in the Long Beach Convention and Entertainment Center. Directed by Rae Allen, the production was part of an eight-month Long Beach Theater Festival program. The stage production was intended to transfer to Broadway after its California season; however, the bi-coastal run was not extended due to the 1978 New York City newspaper strike of 88 days, which hindered all theatre advertising and reduced box-office sales of the new fall season.

In 1979, Powers starred with Roger Moore, Telly Savalas, David Niven, Sonny Bono and Elliott Gould, in the British adventure feature film Escape to Athena, in which a group of Anglo-American prisoners of the Germans scramble to liberate themselves and some Greek art treasures. The production was filmed on location in the Dodecanese islands of Greece in 1978.  This was Powers’ last theatrical film until The Artist's Wife in 2020, in which she played performance artist Ada Risi.

Powers became most widely known as a television star for her role as Jennifer Hart in the American mystery series Hart to Hart, with Robert Wagner as Jonathan Hart, in which they portray a married couple who continually get mixed up in mysterious and/or criminal occurrences which they then solve usually without the assistance of the police. Hart to Hart aired for five seasons from 1979 to 1984. Powers and Wagner later reunited for eight Hart to Hart TV movies in the 1990s.

In 1984, she starred in the TV mini-series Mistral's Daughter, based on Judith Krantz's novel.

In 1985, Powers starred as twins who swap places leading to dire consequences in the two-part TV movie Deceptions.

In 1987, she starred in the real-life TV drama At Mother's Request as the frightening Frances Schreuder, who goaded her 17-year-old-son into killing her father. The script was adapted for television by Richard DeLong Adams and aired on CBS, directed by Michael Tuchner.

Powers starred with John Barrowman in Matador, a 1991 London stage musical, at the Queen's Theater. with a book inspired by Spanish corrida legend El Cordobes. The production was staged by Elijah Moshinsky for producer Laurence Myers, with choreography by Arlene Phillips and Rafael Aguilar, and scenery by William Dudley.

Powers starred with Robert Wagner in the 1993 stage production Love Letters at the Chicago Theatre. The two portrayed Melissa Gardner and Andrew Makepeace Ladd III, telling the story of their 40-year, mostly long-distance relationship without getting up from their chairs.

In 1996, Powers toured as Margo Channing in a production of Applause, with hopes of a Broadway revival, which did not materialize.

Powers toured the UK in 2002 playing Anna Leonowens in a revival of The King and I, and toured the U.S. in 2004 and 2005 in the same role.

Powers released her debut music CD in 2003, titled On The Same Page. The album features selections from the classic Great American Songbook era.

Since 2006, she has been the U.S. location guest-host presenter of the long-running Through the Keyhole panel show.

In 2000–01, she starred in the BBC's popular long-running British medical drama Doctors as Jane Powers, a wealthy businesswoman, and the mother of Dr. Caroline Powers. Jane Powers, after being widowed, was due to marry her much younger fiancé David Wilde, but in the lead-up to the wedding, her daughter (Caroline) and fiancé David fell in love and ran off together. Her last appearance was on June 1, 2001.

On April 30, 2008, she was reunited with Wagner for the filming of a special Hart to Hart edition of the BBC's The Graham Norton Show.

Powers was a contestant in the reality TV show 11th series of I'm a Celebrity...Get Me Out of Here!, in which celebrities retreat into the jungle. She was the first celebrity to be eliminated on November 25, 2011.

Powers started a tour of Looped, a stage play about her former co-star Tallulah Bankhead in Fort Lauderdale, Florida on February 26, 2013.

Powers starred in the musical Gotta Dance, which premiered in Chicago in December 2015 through January 2016. The cast also starred Georgia Engel, Lillias White, and Andre DeShields. The musical was directed and choreographed by Jerry Mitchell, with a book by Chad Beguelin and Bob Martin, and the score by Matthew Sklar and Nell Benjamin.

In November 2017, it was announced that Powers had joined the cast for a developmental reading of Love Affair, a musical with book, music and lyrics by Joseph J. Simeone, based on the 1939 film of the same name. The developmental reading of the musical is being produced by Open Jar Productions as part of their New Works Initiative on November 17, 2017, for an industry-only presentation at the Pershing Square Signature Center.

In 2018, Powers co-starred in the feature film The Artist's Wife alongside lead actors Bruce Dern and Lena Olin. The film's plot centers on Claire (Olin), wife of famed artist Richard Smythson (Dern) and once a promising artist herself,  who has been living in the shadow of her husband's illustrious career. Whilst preparing work for a new exhibition after a long absence from the art world, Richard is diagnosed with Alzheimer's. Directed by Tom Dolby,  the film was released by Strand Releasing in 2020.

In May 2018, Cambridge Arts Theatre announced the casting for the United Kingdom stage tour production of James Roose-Evans' adaptation of Helene Hanff's novel 84 Charing Cross Road, in collaboration with Lee Dean and Salisbury Playhouse. 84 Charing Cross Road, first published in 1970, is a bittersweet comedy based on the extraordinary true story of the remarkable relationship that developed over 20 years, chronicling New York writer Hanff's correspondence with Frank Doel, the chief buyer for Marks & Co, a London bookshop. In the stage production, Powers portrays Helene Hanff, and Clive Francis portrays Frank Doel. The production opened at Darlington Hippodrome on Wednesday 23 May, then toured to Wolverhampton, Malvern, Richmond, Oxford and finishing at Cambridge Arts Theatre on 30 June 2018.

Honors 
For her role as Jennifer Hart, Powers received two Emmy Best Television Actress nominations, and five Golden Globe Award Best Television Actress nominations.

In 1992, Powers was a recipient of a Star on the Hollywood Walk of Fame at 6776 Hollywood Boulevard, category 'Television', presented by the Hollywood Chamber of Commerce.

Powers was awarded the Sarah Siddons Award in 1993 for her stage performance in Love Letters.

On March 12, 2011, Powers received the Steiger Award (Germany) for accomplishment in the arts.

On November 6, 2017, Powers was honored by the Palm Springs Women in Film & Television Organisation (PSWIFT) with the "9th Annual Broken Glass Award" for her work as an actress, author and animal advocate. PSWIFT presents this award to outstanding women from the film and television industry who have "broken through the glass ceiling" in the field of entertainment, the arts and philanthropy. Other 2017 Award recipients included actress Lucie Arnaz, President of LA-SAG-AFTRA Jane Austin, TV executive producer, writer and actress Kellee McQuinn, and Palm Springs, California community philanthropist Nelda Linsk. PSWIFT is a non-profit organization founded in 2001, dedicated to promoting both men and women in the entertainment, new media and creative arts community.

Personal life
Powers was married to actor Gary Lockwood from 1966 to 1972. She had a relationship with actor William Holden from just after her divorce to just before his death that led to their joint involvement with wildlife conservation. She described the relationship by saying they were soul mates. He died in 1981; by the following year, Powers was founding President of the William Holden Wildlife Foundation and a director of the Mount Kenya Game Ranch and Wildlife Conservancy in Nanyuki, Kenya. In the United States, she works with both the Cincinnati Zoo and Atlanta Zoo. She devotes a great deal of time to the cause and is an international guest speaker on wildlife preservation.

Powers declared on BBC Radio 4's Broadcasting House programme that she campaigned for Robert F. Kennedy during his 1968 presidential campaign.

On April 1, 1993, she married French aristocrat Patrick Houitte de La Chesnais (born May 7, 1951, Versailles, France); the couple divorced in 1999. The following year, Powers began a relationship with auditor Tom Carroll, which lasted until his death in August 2014.

A polo player, she was among the first foreign members of the Royal County of Berkshire Polo Club, whose membership includes King Charles III. In 2005, she competed in the Joules United Kingdom National Women's Championships at Ascot.

Health 
In November 2008, Powers, who was a smoker for 20 years, was diagnosed with alveolar carcinoma, a form of lung cancer. She had surgery to remove part of her right lung on January 29, 2009, the same month her mother died of pneumonia, aged 96, in Los Angeles.

Filmography

Film

Television

References

External links

 
 Stefanie Powers' official website

1942 births
Living people
Actresses from Hollywood, Los Angeles
American film actresses
American people of Polish descent
American people of Jewish descent
American polo players
American stage actresses
American television actresses
I'm a Celebrity...Get Me Out of Here! (British TV series) participants
Metro-Goldwyn-Mayer contract players
21st-century American women